The Antidote is the first studio album by American rappers Indo G and Lil' Blunt. It was released in 1994 via Luther Campbell's Luke Records. Production was handled by S.M.K. Sean Pross.

Track listing 
 "Intro"
 "Get on the Mic"
 "Blame It on the Funk"
 "Let's Get Fucked Up"
 "Chillin' Like a Villain"
 "Strictly for da G's"
 "Where Dem Doggs At"
 "20's"
 "Players Don't Fall"
 "You Don't Even Know Me Kid"
 "Life Ain't Nothing But a Bitch"
 "Drop It Off Your Ass"
 "Finger on the Trigger"
 "Real Niggaz Makin Noise"
 "Make It Bounce"
 "Outro"

References

External links

1994 albums
Indo G albums
Luke Records albums
Collaborative albums